The Daehan Fire Insurance Cup 1999 was the eleventh competition of the Korean League Cup, and one of two Korean League Cups held in 1999.

Group stage

Group A

Group B

Knockout stage

Bracket

Semi-finals

Final

Suwon Samsung Bluewings won 2–1 on aggregate.

Awards

Source:

See also
1999 in South Korean football
1999 Korean League Cup
1999 K League
1999 Korean FA Cup

References

External links

1999 Supplementary
1999 domestic association football cups
1999 in South Korean football